Matthew Justin Garrison (born June 2, 1970) is an American jazz bassist.

Since 2011, he has run ShapeShifter Lab in Brooklyn, New York, with Fortuna Sung. Described by the New York Times as "an electric bass virtuoso", he has toured with Herbie Hancock.

His 2000 debut album, Matthew Garrison, was described by Bass Player magazine as having "raised the bar" for electric bass players. He is considered one of the most technically gifted jazz musicians of his generation.

In 2010, Garrison toured with R&B singer Whitney Houston during her Nothing but Love World Tour.

Early life and pre-solo career
The son of Jimmy Garrison (bassist with: Ornette Coleman, John Coltrane) and modern dancer Roberta Escamilla Garrison, Matthew spent much of his childhood in Rome, Italy. In 1988, he returned to the U.S. to live with his godfather Jack DeJohnette with whom he recorded. In 1989, he attended Berklee College of Music in Boston on a scholarship and began to play professionally. In 1994, he moved to New York City where he regularly performed and recorded with Gary Burton, Rashied Ali, Ravi Coltrane, Gil Evans Orchestra, Steve Coleman, Vernon Reid, Chaka Khan, Joni Mitchell, Joe Zawinul, The Saturday Night Live Band, John McLaughlin, John Scofield, Mike Stern, and Wayne Krantz.

Discography

As leader or co-leader
 Matthew Garrison (Garrison Jazz, 2000)
  Shapeshifter (2004)
 Improvision with Alex Machacek, Jeff Sipe (Abstract Logix, 2007)
 Shapeshifter Live (Garrison Jazz, 2011)
 In Movement with Jack DeJohnette, Ravi Coltrane (ECM, 2016)

As sideman
 Rashied Ali, No One in Particular (Survival, 2001)
 Terri Lyne Carrington, More to Say (Real Life Story: Nextgen) (E1, 2009)
 Dennis Chambers, Outbreak (ESC, 2002)
 Steve Coleman, The Tao of Mad Phat (Novus, 1993)
 Steve Coleman, Def Trance Beat (BMG Victor, 1995)
 Pino Daniele, Boogie Boogie Man (RCA, 2010)
 Philipp Gerschlauer & David Fiuczynski, Mikrojazz! (RareNoise, 2017)
 Chico Hamilton, Trio! Live @ Artpark (Joyous Shout, 2008)
 Herbie Hancock, Future 2 Future Live (Columbia, 2002)
 Rita Marcotulli, Us and Them (Casa Del Jazz, 2008)
 Rita Marcotulli, A Pino (Casa del Jazz, 2016)
 John McLaughlin, The Heart of Things (Verve, 1997)
 John McLaughlin, The Heart of Things: Live in Paris (Verve, 2000)
 John McLaughlin, Industrial Zen (Verve, 2006)
 Andy Milne, Forward to Get Back (D'Note, 1997)
 Bob Moses, Time Stood Still (Gramavision, 1994)
 Meshell Ndegeocello, The Spirit Music Jamia: Dance of the Infidel (EmArcy, 2005)
 Wolfgang Reisinger, Refusion (EmArcy, 2006)
 Revolution Void, Increase the Dosage (2005)
 Wallace Roney, Prototype (HighNote, 2004)
 World Saxophone Quartet, Experience (Justin Time, 2004)
 Joe Zawinul, Mark Whitfield, Wallace Roney Quartet (Jazz a Go-go, 1995)
 Joe Zawinul, My People (Tone Center, 1996)

References

External links
Matthew Garrison official website
ShapeShifter Lab official business website

1970 births
Living people
American jazz bass guitarists
American male bass guitarists
Guitarists from New York City
Jazz musicians from New York (state)
21st-century American bass guitarists
21st-century American male musicians
American male jazz musicians
The Zawinul Syndicate members